The Penultimate Peril is the twelfth novel in the children's novel series A Series of Unfortunate Events by Lemony Snicket.

Plot
The Baudelaire orphans, Violet, Klaus and Sunny are travelling with pregnant V.F.D. member Kit Snicket to Hotel Denouement, the last safe place for volunteers to gather. She tells them that, prior to V.F.D.’s gathering in two days, they will be disguised as concierges to observe the mysterious 'J.S.,’ in order to identify him as a volunteer or a villain of V.F.D. The hotel's managers are identical triplets Frank, Dewey and Ernest - Frank is a volunteer, while Ernest is on the opposing side as a villain, and Dewey is someone of legend who many do not believe exists. He has created a book cataloging all information of the V.F.D.

During their first day of disguised employment, the Baudelaires split up to assist the hotel's guests - Violet assists Esmé Squalor and Carmelita Spats by bringing them a harpoon gun, Klaus assists Charles and Sir (the owners of the Lucky Smells Lumbermill) by escorting them to the sauna while also hanging flypaper outside a window for one of the managers, and Sunny assists Hal (an employee at Heimlich Hospital), Vice-Principal Nero, Ms. Bass and Mr. Remora (teachers at Prufrock Preparatory School) while locking a V.F.D device onto a door of the laundry room, converting it into a Vernacularly Fastened Door - all the guests discuss the mysterious J.S. and together the siblings discuss who asked for what, as each of them run into a separate manager.

Klaus concludes that Carmelita Spats requested the harpoon gun to shoot down a bird carrying the sugar bowl, as Sunny mentioned that Hal and a manager were discussing the sugar bowl (an object both volunteers and villains are seeking for unknown reasons) and the Medusoid Mycelium (a deadly fungus parasite they encounter in the previous book) - the flypaper would retrieve the bird's body, and the sugar bowl would fall into the laundry room, in which the room's door was converted into a Vernacularly Fastened Door.

Shortly after his proposal, a man encounters them and reveals himself as Dewey Denouement, the third of the secretly three brothers. He also tells them that a pool reflection of the hotel is the actual safe place, as the hotel's words and structure were designed backward to reflect the actual words onto the pool - beneath the pool is an underwater catalog containing crucial information concerning V.F.D. They are then encountered by Jerome Squalor and Justice Strauss, who have joined V.F.D. after believing messages being sent to J.S were being addressed to them.

While the four re-enter the hotel, Count Olaf intercepts them, and threatens Dewey with a harpoon gun for the code needed to access the door. While the children attempt to prevent the killing, Mr. Poe suddenly enters, causing Olaf to shove the weapon into the Baudelaires' hands — surprised, they drop the gun, causing it to discharge and kill Dewey. As a crowd arrives, the Baudelaires and Olaf are sent to court; however, everyone except for the judges must be blindfolded for it to be legal. The other two judges are later revealed to be The Man with a Beard But No Hair and The Woman With Hair But No Beard. During the hearing, however, the Baudelaires realize that it was a trick for Olaf to kidnap Justice Strauss, pursue the sugar bowl, and burn the hotel and its inhabitants. Klaus, realizing that the sugar bowl was actually underneath the pool, reveals the door code to Olaf. Violet gains access to a boat for all of them to escape the authorities, while Sunny assists in burning the hotel as a signal to V.F.D. that the gathering has been canceled due to the invasion of enemies. The Baudelaires, along with Justice Strauss, attempt to alert everyone about the fire; it is unknown whether anyone escapes.

Shortly after the authorities arrive, the orphans, along with Olaf, are about to disembark by sea; however, Justice attempts to intervene. Sunny apologetically bites her hand, and the four sail away from the area, and out to sea.

Foreshadowing
In the last picture of The Penultimate Peril, Count Olaf and the Baudelaire children sail away from the smoking shore aboard a large ship.

Unlike the other novels, there are no hints or foreshadowing to the next book.

Translations
 Dutch: "" (The Penultimate Peril)
 Finnish: "" (At the Borders of Solution), WSOY, 2006, 
 French: "" (The Penultimate Peril)
 German: ”” (The Outlandish Hotel)
 Japanese: "終わりから二番目の危機" (The Second-to-Last Crisis), Soshisha, 2007, 
 Norwegian: ”Den tolvte trussel” (The Twelfth Threat), Tor Edvin Dahl, Cappelen Damm, 2006, 
 Persian: “خطر ما قبل اخر" (The Penultimate Risk)
 Polish: ”” (The Penultimate Trap)
 Russian: "" (Penultimate Scrape), Azbuka, 2007, 
 Thai: "หายนะก่อนปิดฉาก", Nanmeebooks Teen, 2006,

Adaptation
The book was adapted into the fifth and sixth episodes of the third season of the television series adaptation produced by Netflix.

References

2005 American novels
Books in A Series of Unfortunate Events
HarperCollins books
Sequel novels
2005 children's books
American novels adapted into television shows
Novels set in hotels
Novels set in one day